

Mission
The group's mission is to train the Afghan Air Force able to meet the security requirements of Afghanistan. As part of the 438th Air Expeditionary Wing, the 738th advises the Kandahar Air Wing, which operates in the southern regions of Afghanistan. The group also assists the Kandahar Air Wing in counterinsurgency operations. Group advisers mentor their Afghan counterparts in flight operations, aircraft maintenance, intelligence, logistics, personnel management, communications and base defense.

Units (Inactivated)
441st Air Expeditionary Advisory Squadron
 The 441st Squadron is the operational training squadron of the 738th Air Expeditionary Advisory Group.  The squadron trains members of the Afghanistan Air Force's Kandahar Air Wing on the wing's Mil Mi-17 helicopters and Cessna 208 Caravan aircraft.
 
442d Air Expeditionary Advisory Squadron
 The 442d squadron has about 140 members, of whom about 100 are maintenance contractors from the Ukraine, working for Lockheed Martin.  The contractors perform maintenance and formal instruction, while the 40 military members advise senior leadership in the Kandahar Wing's maintenance group on logistics management.  It focuses on developing instructors within the Afghan Air Force to enable them to take over the training mission.

443d Air Expeditionary Advisory Squadron
 The 443d Squadron provides mission support for the group and its assigned squadrons.

History
The 738th was activated on 29 November 2009 to include the NATO advisory support that had been established at Kandahar in the spring of 2008.  It includes airmen from the United States, Lithuania, Latvia, Ukraine, and Belgium. It is made up of three Air Expeditionary Advisory Squadrons operating out of Kandahar Airfield, Afghanistan.

Lineage
 Constituted as the 738th Air Expeditionary Advisory Group in provisional status on 23 November 2009
 Activated on 25 November 2009
Inactivated on 14 September 2019

Assignments
 438th Air Expeditionary Wing, 25 November 2009 – 14 September 2019

Components
 441st Air Expeditionary Advisory Squadron, 25 November 2009 – 14 September 2019
 442d Air Expeditionary Advisory Squadron, 25 November 2009 – 14 September 2019
 443d Air Expeditionary Advisory Squadron, 25 November 2009 – 14 September 2019

Aircraft
 Mil Mi-17 (2009–2019)
 Cessna 208 Caravan (2009–2019)
 MD-530 Cayuse Warrior (2012–2019)
 A-29 Super Tucano (2012–2019)
UH-60 Black Hawk (2017–2019)

Awards

References

 Notes

 Citations

Air expeditionary groups of the United States Air Force
Military units and formations established in 2009
Military advisory groups